Frederick III, Margrave of Brandenburg-Ansbach (1 May 1616, Ansbach – 6 September 1634, Nördlingen) was a German nobleman. He was the eldest son of Joachim Ernst, Margrave of Brandenburg-Ansbach, who he succeeded in 1625. He was killed at the Battle of Nördlingen in 1634 unmarried and without issue, meaning he was succeeded by his younger brother Albert II.

Ancestors 

|-

1616 births
1634 deaths
Margraves of Brandenburg-Ansbach